ISO/IEC 31010 is a standard concerning risk management codified by The International Organization for Standardization and The International Electrotechnical Commission (IEC). The full name of the standard is ISO.IEC 31010:2019 – Risk management – Risk assessment techniques.

Risk assessment steps
identifying the risk and the reason for its occurrence
identifying the consequences if the risk occurs
identifying the probability of the risk occurring once more
identifying factors that reduce the consequences or probability of the risk

Scope
The ISO 31010 standard supports the ISO 31000 standard. It supplies information as to the selection and application of risk assessment techniques.

Risk assessment and the risk management process

Risk assessment is part of the core elements of risk management defined in ISO 31000, which are:
communication and consultation
establishing the context
risk assessment (risk identification, risk analysis, risk evaluation)
risk treatment
monitoring and review

„Risk assessment is the overall process of risk identification, risk analysis and risk evaluation” (ISO 31010)

Risk can be assessed at any level of the company’s operations or goals.

Risk assessment techniques 

There are 31 risk assessment techniques listed on Annex B of ISO/IEC 31010.

 Brainstorming
 Structured or semi-structured interviews
 Delphi method
 Checklist
 Preliminary hazard analysis (PHA)
 Hazard and operability study (HAZOP)
 Hazard analysis and critical control points (HACCP)
 Toxicity assessment
 Structured What If Technique (SWIFT)
 Scenario analysis
 Business impact analysis
 Root cause analysis
 Failure mode and effects analysis (FMEA)
 Fault tree analysis
 Event tree analysis
 Cause and consequence analysis
 Cause-and-effect analysis
 Layer protection analysis (LOPA)
 Decision tree
 Human reliability analysis (HRA)
 Bow tie analysis
 Reliability centered maintenance
 Sneak circuit analysis
 Markov analysis
 Monte Carlo simulation
 Bayesian statistics and Bayes nets
 FN curve
 Risk index
 Risk Matrix
 Cost/benefit analysis
 Multi-criteria decision analysis (MCDA)

References
 IEC 31010:2019: Risk management — Risk assessment techniques

31010
Risk management in business